The Kerry Film Festival is an annual film festival that takes place in County Kerry, Republic of Ireland, during October / November. The Kerry Film Festival is funded by Kerry County Council, Fáilte Ireland, the Arts Council as well as having corporate sponsorship.

History 
Kerry Film Festival was established in 2000 but remained a small regional festival throughout its first years, with 1,700 attendees at the 2006 festival. Then, in 2007, under new management the festival exploded becoming the fastest growing festival in all of Ireland, with audiences numbers increasing by nearly 600% over the coming years. In 2011 the audience topped 10,000 for the first time, with more than 20,000 attendees at various screenings and workshops throughout the year.

Kerry Film Festival screens a comprehensive selection of short films (International, Irish, Kerry, Student, Animation).  The festival also screens carefully curated feature films, both narrative and documentary. Many of these screenings feature Q & A sessions afterwards.

Kerry Film Festival seeks to bring the film-making community together for workshops and industry days. One of the main events is the Irish Film and Television Awards hosted industry networking event which brings key industry personnel together.

Short Film Competition 
In 2007 the Kerry Film Festival pivoted to focus primarily on a number of short film competitions. To do so the festival lined up a number of A-List adjudicators.

Gabriel Byrne headed up the adjudication panel in 2007, while Liam Neeson headed up the panel in 2008. Other adjudicators in 2008 included John Carney, director of Once, and Kirsten Sheridan, director of Disco Pigs and Academy Award nominated writer for the semi-autobiographical film In America.

In 2010, the adjudication panel was headed up by Jeremy Irons, and Michael Fassbender. While Cillian Murphy and Paul Greengrass were members of the adjudication panel in 2011.

Other adjudicators have included Jim Cummings and Benjamin Cleary. The festival also screens feature films.

Many films seen at Kerry Film Festival went on to garner international acclaim, including 2010 Academy Award short-listed Granny O’ Grimm's Sleeping Beauty and The Door; 2012 Oscar® short-listed Head Over Heels; 2014 Oscar® winner Mr. Hublot; 2016 Oscar® winner Stutterer and 2019 Oscar® nominees Mother and Detainment.

The Maureen O'Hara Award

History of The Maureen O'Hara Award 
In late 2007 Kerry Film Festival announced the creation of the Maureen O'Hara Award for women that have excelled in film. At that time, it was one of the few film awards, anywhere in the world, offered exclusively to women and the first named award in Ireland. The Maureen O' Hara Award acknowledges women that have demonstrated outstanding leadership in their respective fields in film. It was presented for the first time at the 2008 Kerry Film Festival.

2008 Maureen O'Hara Award 
Brenda Fricker was the inaugural recipient. The award was presented to her by Jim Sheridan, who directed her in the Oscar-winning My Left Foot (1989).

At the ceremony, Fricker's hand was in a sling because of a shoulder injury, the actress made famous by My Left Foot quipped to reporters the injury was to "my left shoulder, not my left foot".

She was presented with a specially commissioned piece of pottery of joined masks representing tragedy and comedy, made by the master potter Louis Mulcahy. The award was "an honour, a privilege, a delight," she said, following the presentation.

Maureen O'Hara wanted to be at the ceremony but was not well enough to attend, chairman of the Kerry Film Festival John Kennedy said. She had been closely involved and sent a message to the ceremony: "Brenda has displayed courage and determination throughout her career and her Oscar Winning role as Mrs Brown in My Left Footis one of the great highlights in Irish acting. I'm absolutely delighted that Brenda will accept this award and I wish her the very best in her career, in film and, most importantly, in her life," O'Hara said.

2009 Maureen O'Hara Award 
In 2009 the award was presented to Rebecca Miller who was in Kerry to pick up the award with her husband, Daniel Day-Lewis at a ceremony with Dave Fanning as MC.

2010 Maureen O'Hara Award 
In 2010, Oscar winning French screen star Juliette Binoche flew into Kerry to pick up the Maureen O'Hara Award at the Kerry Film Festival.

Binoche, the winner of numerous international film awards, including an Oscar for her role in 1996 film The English Patient, arrived in person to pick up the Award from Maureen O'Hara at the award ceremony in Tralee's Siamsa Tíre.

The packed theatre rose to its feet shortly after 2pm as Binoche linked arms with the movie legend, Maureen O'Hara, on stage. Tearfully accepting her award Binoche, whose films in the English speaking world also include Chocolat, opposite Johnny Depp, thanked "Maureen for all the stories you have given us" and encouraged all the directors present to follow their own path and resist pressure to conform.

2011 Maureen O'Hara Award 
Fionnula Flanagan picked up the award in 2011.

2012 Maureen O'Hara Award 
Saoirse Ronan won the award in 2012.

KFF has previously featured successful short films such as the Oscar short-listed animation Head over Heels in 2012, the 2014 Oscar winner Mr. Hublot and in 2015 the highly acclaimed Academy Award winner S t u t t e r e r by Ben Cleary.

Maureen O'Hara Award Recipients 
 2008 - Brenda Fricker
 2009 - Rebecca Miller
 2010 - Juliette Binoche
 2011 - Fionnula Flanagan
 2012 - Saoirse Ronan
 2013 - Consolata Boyle
 2014 - Sarah Elizabeth Jones
 2017 - Emer Reynolds
 2018 - Deirdre O'Kane
 2019 - Bronagh Gallagher
 2020 - Jessie Buckley
 2021 - Kathleen Kennedy

Secret Cine Club
In 2013, Kerry Film Festival launched the Secret Cine Club that screened "secret" movies in a "secret" location. The first screening took place on Little Samphire Island, off the coast of Fenit. The first film screened was Jaws.

Other screenings have included films shown in Dingle Court House, a school, an organic farm and screenings in Listowel, Dingle and Killarney as well as in Cahersiveen and various locations around Tralee.

References

External links
 Kerry Film Festival
 Official Kerry Film Festival Twitter
 Official Kerry Film Festival Facebook
 Official Kerry Film Festival Secret Cine Club Facebook

Film festivals in Ireland
County Kerry
Recurring events established in 2000